Vuelvealavida, Rompecolchón, and Siete Potencias (Back into Life, Mattress-breaker and Seven Powers) are names given to various seafood cocktails in Venezuela. These cocktails are believed, perhaps apocryphally, to serve as revitalisers or sexual stimulants. This has not been confirmed by conventional science. These cocktails are commonly sold on Venezuelan beaches.

References

Venezuelan drinks